4th Illinois Volunteer Infantry Regiment was an infantry regiment of the United States Volunteers that served in the United States Army during the Mexican–American War and Spanish–American War.

Service
During the Mexican–American War the regiment was known as the 4th Regiment of Illinois Volunteers and was raised for 12 months (July 1846 – May 1847). It was under the command of Colonel Edward D. Baker.

During the Spanish–American War the regiment served as part of the occupation forces in Cuba. It was mustered in on 19–20 May 1898 at Springfield, Illinois, and was mustered out on 2 May 1899 at Augusta, Georgia.

See also
 List of U.S. Army, Navy and Volunteer units in the Mexican–American War
 United States Volunteers

External links
McLean County played its part in Mexican-American War - Pantagraph (Bloomington, Illinois newspaper)

Military units and formations in Illinois
Military units and formations of the United States in the Spanish–American War